Larnach may refer to:

People
Guy Larnach-Nevill, 4th Marquess of Abergavenny (1883–1954), British peer
James Walker Larnach (1849–1919), owner of Jeddah, winner of the 1898 Derby
John Larnach (1805–1869), father of William Larnach and overseer for James Mudie
Mike Larnach (born 1952), Scottish footballer
Trevor Larnach (born 1997), American baseball player
William Larnach (1833–1898), New Zealand businessman and politician known for building Larnach Castle

Other uses
Larnach Castle, in Dunedin, New Zealand

See also
Tom Larnach-Jones, co-founder of the Australian record label Trifekta